Denzel Perryman (born December 5, 1992) is an American football middle linebacker who is a free agent. He played college football at Miami.

High school career
Perryman attended Coral Gables Senior High School. He recorded 177 tackles, 12 for losses, 9 sacks, and 5 interception returns for touchdowns and 9 interceptions as a senior. He was also an area Defensive Player of the Year as a junior, registering 166 solo tackles and had 105 tackles, 9 sacks and 6 interceptions as a sophomore.

College career
Played as a true freshman, saw action in all 12 games, earning 8 starts. He finished first among ACC freshmen and second overall on team with 127 tackles (97 solo, 22 assists). Tied for second-highest tackle-for-loss total on team with 6.5. Played in nine games his sophomore season, making nine starts mostly at middle linebacker. He had 64 total tackles (45 solo) and 6.0 tackles-for-loss. Also made Third-team All-ACC.

As a junior in 2013, Perryman was a first-team All-Atlantic Coast Conference (ACC) selection. He was again an All-ACC selection as a senior in 2014. He was a semi-finalist for top linebacker of the year in 2014

College statistics

Professional career
On November 4, 2014, it was announced that Perryman had received an invitation to appear in the 2015 Senior Bowl. He was one of four Miami players to be invited, including Phillip Dorsett, Clive Walford, and Ladarius Gunter. He accepted his invitation and attended the Senior Bowl as part of Jacksonville Jaguars' head coach Gus Bradley's South team, but was unfortunately unable to play in the actual game due to a minor injury he suffered earlier the week in practice. Although he didn't play, he was able to garner interest from the San Diego Chargers after having an impressive performance in practice. Perryman was one of 35 collegiate linebackers to attend the NFL Scouting Combine in Indianapolis, Indiana. He performed all of the combine drills and finished second among linebackers in the bench press and 18th in the 40-yard dash. He was unable to perform the short shuttle and three-cone drill after sustaining a hip injury. On April 1, 2015, Perryman attended Miami's pro day and opted to perform the 40-yard dash (4.70s), 20-yard dash (2.65s), 10-yard dash (1.61s), bench press (30 reps), and vertical jump (33") before a hamstring injury during his second attempt in the 40-yard dash kept him from completing the short shuttle, and three cone drill again. Although his was hampered with multiple injuries during the draft process, Perryman was still able attain a second to third round projection from NFL draft experts and scouts. He was ranked the fourth best inside linebacker in the draft by NFLDraftScout.com.

San Diego / Los Angeles Chargers
The San Diego Chargers selected Perryman in the second round (48th overall) of the 2015 NFL Draft. He was the seventh linebacker selected in 2015 and was drafted by the Chargers' to provide depth after they experienced multiple injuries to their linebacker corps, including injuries to Dwight Freeney, Manti Te'o, and Melvin Ingram.

2015
On May 14, 2015, the San Diego Chargers signed Perryman to a four-year, $4.77 million contract that includes $2.38 million guaranteed and a signing bonus of $1.73 million.

Perryman was limited at beginning of organized team activities due to a hamstring injury. He was heavily criticized for playing in a charity dodgeball game while injured and not medically cleared.
Throughout training camp, he competed for a job as the starting inside linebacker against Manti Te'o and Donald Butler. Head coach Mike McCoy named Perryman the backup inside linebacker behind veterans Donald Butler and Manti Te'o to start the regular season.

He made his professional regular season debut in the San Diego Chargers' season-opener against the Detroit Lions and made one solo tackle during their 33–28 victory. On October 18, 2015, Perryman earned his first career start in place of Manti Te'o, who suffered an ankle injury the previous week. He recorded eight combined tackles during the 27–20 loss at the Green Bay Packers. He started two consecutive games before sustaining a pectoral injury and was replaced by Kavell Conner in Weeks 8–9. In Week 11, Perryman and Te'o both returned from injury and defensive coordinator John Pagano named them the starting inside linebackers and demoted starters Donald Butler and Kavell Conner. Pagano cited he wanted to give Te'o and Perryman experience as the Chargers were 2-8 going into Week 11. On November 22, 2015, Perryman made his official return from injury and recorded six combined tackles and made his first career sack on Alex Smith as the Chargers were routed 33-3 by the Kansas City Chiefs. In Week 13, he made a season-high ten solo tackles in a 17–3 loss to the Denver Broncos. On December 24, 2015, he collected a season-high 11 combined tackles and sacked Oakland Raiders' quarterback Derek Carr during a 23–20 loss. Perryman finished his rookie season in  season with a total of 73 combined tackles (64 solo) and two sacks in 14 games and nine starts.

2016
Perryman entered training camp slated as the starting inside linebacker, along with Manti Te'o, after the Chargers released Donald Butler and Kavell Conner during the offseason. His position was challenged by Nick Dzubnar after Perryman suffered an undisclosed injury in camp and was sidelined for a few weeks. Head coach Mike McCoy named Te'o and Perryman the starting inside linebackers, along with Kyle Emanuel and Melvin Ingram.

On September 25, Perryman recorded a season-high ten combined tackles and a sack on Andrew Luck during a 26–22 loss at the Indianapolis Colts. Perryman suffered a shoulder injury and was sidelined for the Chargers' Week 5 loss at the Oakland Raiders. He returned the following week to help a depleted defense, but was still dealing with an injured shoulder. On October 23, 2016, Perryman collected seven combined tackles, a pass break-up, and made his first career interception off of Matt Ryan during a 33-20 overtime victory at the Atlanta Falcons. Perryman helped the Chargers come back from a 17-point deficit as the defense held the Falcons to three points in the second half. His interception came with three minutes remaining in the fourth quarter and set up the San Diego's game-tying drive. He also made a crucial stop on fourth down in overtime, tackling running back Devonta Freeman for a one-yard loss to set up Josh Lambo's game-winning 42-yard field goal. He injured his hamstring and missed two consecutive games (Weeks 9–10). Perryman returned in Week 12 and tied his season-high of ten combined tackles during a 21–13 victory at the Houston Texans. On December 24, 2016, Perryman recorded seven combined tackles and a sack in the Chargers' 20–17 loss at the Cleveland Browns. He left in the fourth quarter after suffering a knee injury and was inactive for their Week 17 loss to the Kansas City Chiefs. He finished the  season with 72 combined tackles (56 solo), two sacks, and an interception in 12 games and 11 starts. The San Diego Chargers finished last in the AFC West with a 5–11 record in 2016 and did not qualify for the playoffs.

2017
On January 2, 2017, the San Diego Chargers fired head coach Mike McCoy. On January 12, 2017, San Diego Chargers' owner Alex Spanos announced that the team planned to immediately return to Los Angeles for the 2017 season and return as the Los Angeles Chargers.

Perryman entered training camp slated as the starting middle linebacker by head coach Anthony Lynn after defensive coordinator Gus Bradley switched the Chargers' defense to a base 4-3 defense that only requires one middle linebacker instead of two inside linebackers. On August 13, 2017, Perryman suffered a serious ankle injury that will require surgery during the Chargers' preseason-opener against the Seattle Seahawks and was expected to miss 6–8 weeks. On September 4, 2017, the Los Angeles Chargers officially placed Perryman on injured reserve.

On November 7, 2017, he was activated off injured reserve to the active roster. On November 12, 2017, Perryman started his first game of the season at outside linebacker. Defensive coordinator Gus Bradley opted to have Hayes Pullard remain as the starting middle linebacker after a promising performance during Perryman's absence. Perryman went on to record a season-high ten combined tackles in his return, as the Chargers were defeated by the Jacksonville Jaguars 20–17. On December 16, 2017, he was carted off the field after suffering a hamstring injury in the first half of the Chargers' 30–13 loss at the Kansas City Chiefs. He was inactive for Week 16 before returning to play in the Chargers' Week 17 win over the Oakland Raiders. He finished his third season with 37 combined tackles (25 solo) in seven games and six starts.

2018
Perryman entered the 2018 season as the starting middle linebacker. He started the first nine games before suffering a knee injury in Week 10. It was revealed that he sustained an injury to his LCL and would need surgery on his hamstring. He was placed on injured reserve on November 13, 2018.

2019
On March 8, 2019, Perryman signed a two-year, $12 million contract extension with the Chargers.
In week 13 against the Denver Broncos, Perryman recorded his first interception of the season off rookie quarterback Drew Lock in the 23–20 loss.

2020
In Week 11 against the New York Jets, Perryman recorded his first sack of the season on Joe Flacco during the 34–28 win.

Carolina Panthers
On March 18, 2021, Perryman signed a two-year contract with the Carolina Panthers.

Las Vegas Raiders
On August 25, 2021, Perryman was traded to the Las Vegas Raiders, along with a 2022 seventh-round pick, for a 2022 sixth-round pick. Perryman had a career year with the Las Vegas Raiders and recorded a franchise high of 154 tackles, which was also a career high for Perryman. He was voted to his first Pro Bowl selection.

Personal life
Perryman's cousin is former Florida wide receiver and cornerback Quinton Dunbar.

References

External links
Los Angeles Chargers bio

1992 births
Living people
Sportspeople from Coral Gables, Florida
Players of American football from Florida
American football linebackers
Miami Hurricanes football players
San Diego Chargers players
Los Angeles Chargers players
Carolina Panthers players
Las Vegas Raiders players
American Conference Pro Bowl players